Michael Dalle Stelle (born 5 July 1990) is an Italian racing driver.

Career

Formula Azzurra 
Following a career in karting, Dalle Stelle graduated to formula racing in 2007 by taking part in the Formula Azzurra championship. Driving for the Corbetta Competizioni team, he finished seventh in the championship.

Formula Three 
Dalle Stelle moved up to the Italian Formula Three Championship for 2008, where he finished ninth in the drivers' championship.

GP2 Series 
Dalle Stelle was signed by the Durango team to take part in the 2008–09 GP2 Asia Series season from the second round of the championship. He replaced Carlos Iaconelli, and his team-mate was Davide Valsecchi.

Racing record

Career summary

Complete GP2 Series results

Complete GP2 Asia Series results
(key) (Races in bold indicate pole position) (Races in italics indicate fastest lap)

References

External links 
 

1990 births
Living people
Italian racing drivers
Formula Azzurra drivers
Italian Formula Three Championship drivers
GP2 Asia Series drivers
Auto GP drivers
International GT Open drivers
Team Lazarus drivers
Durango drivers